The 2008 WNBA season was the 12th season for the New York Liberty. The first ever outdoor professional basketball game was held at Arthur Ashe Stadium between the New York Liberty and the Indiana Fever. Over 19,000 fans attended the game.

Offseason
The following player was selected in the Expansion Draft: 
 Ann Wauters New York Liberty

Transactions
April 25 The Liberty waived Jennifer Benningfield.
April 16 The Liberty signed Kia Wright and Megan Darrah to training camp contracts.
April 2 The Liberty signed Tiffani Johnson, Jenni Benningfield and LaToya Davis to training camp contracts.
March 18 The Liberty signed Loree Moore to a three-year contract extension.
March 12 The Liberty signed Janel McCarville to a three-year contract extension.
March 11 The Liberty signed free agent Megan Duffy to a training camp contract.
March 4 The Liberty re-signed free agent Shameka Christon, re-signed Ashley Battle and signed Lindsay Bowen to a training camp contract.

WNBA Draft

Preseason

Regular season

Season standings

Season Schedule

Player stats
Note: GP= Games played; REB= Rebounds; AST= Assists; STL = Steals; BLK = Blocks; PTS = Points; AVG = Average

Roster

Playoffs

Awards and honors

References

New York Liberty seasons
New York
New York Liberty